Gliese 146 is a K5V class star located in the constellation Horologium. At 44.4 light years, GJ 146 has an apparent magnitude of +8.57. Gliese 146 is also known as HD 22496, HIP 16711, SAO-216392, and LHS 1563.

Its speed relative to the sun is 38.1 km/second, and its galactic orbit ranges between 20,800 and 25,400 light years from the center of the Galaxy, placing it within a thin disk. It is a suspected variable star. It belongs to the Hyades supercluster of stars It is one of 155 K-type stars within 50 light years. 

Gliese 146 is a flare star, with average flare frequency 0.23 flares per day.

Planetary system
It is one of 500 stars selected in 2009 for the SCUBA-2 All Sky Survey for stars with debris disks. The debris disk was not detected by any survey as in 2015 though.

In 2021, a Sub-Neptune planet HD 22496b was discovered utilizing a Doppler spectroscopy method.

See also

 Stars between 13 and 15 parsecs
 Habitability of K-type main-sequence star systems

References

External links
 

Horologium (constellation)
K-type main-sequence stars
0146
022496
016711
CD−48 1011
J03350093-4825089 
016711
Planetary systems with one confirmed planet